Iloilo United Royals, also known as Iloilo United Royals Cocolife due to sponsorship reasons, are a professional basketball team in the Maharlika Pilipinas Basketball League.

History 
JJ Javelosa, who would later own the team, and basketball coach Nash Racela conceived of an idea for an Iloilo team in the Maharlika Pilipinas Basketball League (MPBL) while playing golf. Racela brought in his co-coach Eric Gonzales to the nascent team. Javelosa, would have tapped his son Jay, who was then playing college basketball for the Ateneo Blue Eagles, while Racela would have recruited from his varsity FEU Tamaraws team. MPBL founder Manny Pacquiao approved of the plan, but was almost shelved when a sponsor backed out. The elder Javelosa eventually found new sponsors, and named the team "Iloilo United Royals" as Iloilo City was the original "queen city of the South", while "United" was added to emphasize unity among the Ilonggo people.

2019–20 season 
The Royals qualified to the playoffs in its debut season, and was eliminated by the Basilan Steel in the South Division quarterfinals.

2021 Invitationals 
The Royals again qualified to the playoffs in the 2021 MPBL Invitational, but were eliminated in the quarterfinals by the Nueva Ecija Rice Vanguards.

2022 season 
Iloilo skipped the 2022 MPBL season, with Javelosa stating that they took a leave of absence as they were uncertain that the MPBL will hold a tournament due to the COVID-19 pandemic in the Philippines.

2023 season 
The Royals were announced to be one of the teams returning to the MPBL in time for the 2023 season. Manu Inigo replaced Eric Gonzales as coach, with Cocolife as the principal sponsor.

Current roster

Head coaches
Eric Gonzales (2019–2021)
Manu Inigo (2023–present)

Season-by-season records
Records from the 2022 MPBL season:

References

 

 
Maharlika Pilipinas Basketball League teams
2019 establishments in the Philippines
Basketball teams established in 2019